The England Lions cricket team toured India in January and February 2019 to play two first-class matches and five List-A matches against the India A cricket team. India A won the unofficial ODI series 4–1, and the unofficial Test series 1–0.

Squads

Joe Clarke and Tom Kohler-Cadmore were dropped from the squad after their involvement in the Alex Hepburn rape trial, detailing their “sexual conquests” on WhatsApp,  was revealed. They were replaced by Will Jacks and Tom Moores. Tom Bailey was added to unofficial ODI squad after Saqib Mahmood's visa was delayed due to his Pakistani heritage. Saqib was eventually withdrawn from the team. Steven Mullaney replaced Tom Moores in the unofficial ODI squad after Moores suffered a leg injury which ruled him out of the team. K. L. Rahul was added to the unofficial ODI squad after his suspension was provisionally lifted.

Tour Match (List-A)

1st One-Day Warm-up Match: Indian Board's President's XI vs England Lions

2nd One-Day Warm-up Match: Indian Board's President's XI vs England Lions

India 'A' vs England Lions List-A Series

1st Unofficial ODI

2nd Unofficial ODI

3rd Unofficial ODI

4th Unofficial ODI

5th Unofficial ODI

Tour Match (First-Class)

Two-Day Warm-up Match: Indian Board's President's XI vs England Lions

India 'A' vs England Lions First-Class Series

1st Unofficial Test

2nd Unofficial Test

External links
 Series home at ESPN Cricinfo

References 

A team cricket
2019 in Indian cricket
2019 in English cricket